As head coach at Northridge Preparatory School (Niles, IL) for the past 18 seasons, Will Rey has helped establish a standard of basketball excellence with the Knights. Despite typically competing against schools with larger enrollments, the Knights have amassed a 347-162 (.681) overall record and a sparkling 162-44 (.786) mark in conference games since Coach Rey’s arrival in 2004.

Moreover, Northridge teams captured seven IHSA 2A Regional Championships in Coach Rey’s tenure, including a school-record trifecta in 2008, 2009, and 2010. The 2019-20 team’s 27-7 overall tally set a school record for wins in a season, while the 2008-09 team compiled a school-best 15 consecutive wins and a “Sweet 16” finish in the Illinois Class 2A high school tournament. The Knights made their second “Sweet 16” state tournament appearance during the 2014-15 season. In 2017-18, the Knights were undefeated conference champions (12-0), a school first.

Under Coach Rey’s experienced leadership, the Knights have garnered five conference championships, six conference second-place finishes, and 4 large-school holiday tournament championships. The 2011-12 team finished undefeated at home (13-0) for the first time in school history. The veteran coach received IBCA District Coach-of-the-Year Awards in 2009, 2014, 2015, 2018, 2020, and 2022; he was named conference Coach-of-the-Year in 2007, 2008, 2013, 2017, and 2018.

In January 2021, the Chicago Sun-Times identified Northridge as one of the Top 50 winningest high school basketball programs in the Chicago regiona during the previous decade; Northridge was ranked the area’s 31st winningest program with a stellar 206-86 (.705) record. During the 2021-22 season, Coach Rey eclipsed the 400 career wins milestone as a high school head coach.

Before arriving at Northridge, Coach Rey spent 19 years coaching college basketball. In 1985, he joined Jim Crews at the University of Evansville. He helped the Purple Aces win two conference championships, make 2nd round appearances in the Division I NCAA and NIT tournaments, compile a 35-game home winning streak, and attain a Top-25 national ranking! At Evansville, Coach Rey helped recruit and develop two of the nation’s leading scorers: Marty Simmons (Utah Jazz and current Eastern Illinois University head coach) and Scott Haffner (NBA Heat and Hornets). He also recruited and coached Dan Godfread (NBA Timberwolves and Rockets).

In 1989, Loyola University Chicago called on Coach Rey to return home and turn around their program. As head coach, the Ramblers defeated national programs such as Notre Dame, Purdue, Wisconsin, Butler, Dayton, Northwestern, and St. Louis during his five years. After Loyola, he coached at Saint Mary’s University and assisted former UCLA & Indiana coach Ed Schilling at Wright State University in Dayton, Ohio. During Coach Rey’s tenure at Wright State, the Raiders produced back-to-back 18 and 17-win seasons highlighted by upset wins over 8th-ranked and eventual NCAA Champion Michigan State and a thrilling overtime victory over the 20th-ranked and undefeated Butler Bulldogs at historic Hinkle Fieldhouse.

From 1977 through 1985, before moving to the collegiate coaching ranks, Coach Rey coached basketball at three Chicago-area high schools: Gordon Tech (now DePaul Prep), Crete-Monee, and Fenwick. As an assistant to former long-time NBA coach Bob Ociepka at Gordon Tech, the Rams made one IHSA 2A "Elite 8" appearance and two "Sweet 16" appearances. Coach Rey also led the lower-level Rams to a 53-13 (.803) overall record, two Chicago Catholic League Championships, and one second-place finish. 

Coach Rey received the highest honor available to an Illinois high school basketball coach when the IBCA inducted him into their Hall-of-Fame in 2015. Two years later, in 2017, the Chicago Catholic League also placed him into their Hall-of-Fame. A lecturer and instructor at the nationally renowned Five-Star Basketball Camp for 30 years, Coach Rey was also inducted into the Five-Star Basketball Hall-of-Fame with basketball coaches and players such as Bob Knight, Chuck Daly, Hubie Brown, Michael Jordan, Isiah Thomas, Christian Laettner, and Patrick Ewing. In February 2010, Coach Rey received Sports Faith International’s Lifetime Coaching Achievement Award.

A passionate educator, Coach Rey has produced 13 instructional DVDs for basketball coaches and players sold worldwide by three of the nation’s leading producers of coaching education resources: Championship Productions, Breakthrough Basketball, and Sysko’s. In addition, he has spoken at scores of basketball coaches’ clinics and seminars around the country, including the highly regarded PGC/Glazier Clinics, the Medalist Basketball Clinics, and state association coaches’ conferences in Illinois, Wisconsin, Iowa, and Minnesota. Coach Rey has been a guest on several national coaching podcasts, where he has shared the successes of Northridge Basketball student-athletes and their teams.

Along with his duties as Athletic Director and Varsity Basketball Coach at Northridge, Coach Rey serves on the school’s Administrative Council and teaches in the Religion Department. Born in Havana, Cuba, and raised in Chicago, he earned a bachelor’s degree in the Social Sciences from Northeastern Illinois University and a master’s degree in Guidance & Counseling from Concordia University Chicago. Coach Rey and his late wife, Diane, have three grown children and seven grandchildren.

References

External links 
 Northridge Prep profile

1953 births
Living people
Sportspeople from Havana
High school basketball coaches in Illinois
Evansville Purple Aces men's basketball coaches
Loyola Ramblers men's basketball coaches
Saint Mary's Cardinals men's basketball coaches
Wright State Raiders men's basketball coaches
Wilmington Quakers men's basketball coaches